Devon Price is an American psychologist, author, blogger, and autism rights advocate. He is the author of Unmasking Autism: Discovering the New Faces of Neurodiversity and Laziness Does Not Exist, and also self-publishes shorter pieces on Medium and Psychology Today.

Career 

Price is a professor and member of the full-time faculty at Loyola University Chicago's School of Continuing and Professional Studies. 

Price's written works have explored themes such as Autism identity, trans identity, masking, the mental health consequences of masking, and the process of unmasking. Price has delved into the intersectional nature of neurodiversity and the  experiences of autistic people of color.

His book Unmasking Autism has been cited in academic papers that explore autism from various angles including autism in women and attitudes in college students. He has conducted research on pathological demand avoidance, which he contextualizes as an act of consent and self-advocacy.

Price has also written about the concepts of laziness, productivity and self-worth. His book, Laziness Does Not Exist grew out of a viral blog post. He makes the claim that laziness is a sign of other mental health issues.

Laziness Does Not Exist has been cited in academic discussions of techniques for education.

Bibliography  

 Unmasking Autism: Discovering the New Faces of Neurodiversity (2022) 
 Laziness Does Not Exist (2021)

References 

Autism rights movement
American social psychologists
Loyola University Chicago alumni
Loyola University Chicago faculty
Year of birth missing (living people)
Living people